A constitutional referendum was held in the Batavian Republic on 6 October 1801. After a previous referendum in 1798 resulted in a new constitution being approved, the French were not satisfied with this constitution, and under their influence a new constitution was written.

In 1801, a referendum was held about the new constitution. Non-voters were counted as if they agreed to the new constitution, and the constitution passed with 87.46% in favour. On 16 October 1801, the new constitution became official.

Results

References

1801
1801 referendums
Constitutional referendum
Constitutional referendums
October 1801 events